Grimmia is a genus of mosses (Bryophyta), originally named by Jakob Friedrich Ehrhart in honour of Johann Friedrich Carl Grimm, a physician and botanist from Gotha, Germany.

Geographic distribution 
Although predominantly occurring in the moderate zones, representatives of the cosmopolitan genus Grimmia may be found in all parts of the world, from Alaska to the most southern point of Chile, and from Siberia to South Africa, though in tropic regions, e.g. Hawaii and Indonesia, Grimmia species only occur high up in the mountains.

Identification 
Grimmia is a notoriously difficult genus in terms of identification, and in the majority of herbaria a considerable number of species was found misidentified. The American bryologist Geneva Sayre (1911–1992), who worked for many years on a monograph of the North American Grimmias, indicated in an original way these difficulties, as she said: "it contains an ambigua, a varia, a decipiens, a controversa, a revisa and at least two anomalas".

Publications 
In the Index Muscorum, the genus Grimmia is represented with 800 names of published species. As since Loeske (1930), no revision of the European species had been carried out.

The Dutch bryologist H. C. Greven started in 1990 with Grimmia fieldwork and a revision of the Grimmia collections from important European herbaria. The results were published in "Grimmia Hedw. (Grimmiaceae, Musci) in Europe".

After examining the Grimmia collections from herbaria in North- and South America, South Africa, Australia and New Zealand, and about 50 Grimmia collecting trips in all continents, Grimmias of the World was published. An important contribution was the revision of Grimmia in North America.

In the past decades, some more bryologists became interested in the genus Grimmia. Jesús Muñoz published a herbaria revision of Grimmia in Latin America, and Maier studied herbarium specimens of Grimmia from the Himalaya.

Classification

The genus Grimmia contains the following species:

Grimmia abyssinica 
Grimmia acuta 
Grimmia afroincurva 
Grimmia ahmadiana 
Grimmia albida 
Grimmia alpestris 
Grimmia alpestris 
Grimmia ambigua 
Grimmia amblyophylla 
Grimmia americana 
Grimmia andina 
Grimmia angustissima 
Grimmia anodon 
Grimmia anomala 
Grimmia antipodum 
Grimmia aquatica 
Grimmia arctica 
Grimmia arcuata 
Grimmia arenaria 
Grimmia argyrotricha 
Grimmia arizonae 
Grimmia atrata 
Grimmia attenuata 
Grimmia australis 
Grimmia austrofunalis 
Grimmia austroleucophaea 
Grimmia basaltica 
Grimmia bicolor 
Grimmia boliviana 
Grimmia boschbergiana 
Grimmia brachydictyon 
Grimmia brachypus 
Grimmia breviseta 
Grimmia brittoniae 
Grimmia browniana 
Grimmia brownii 
Grimmia caespiticia 
Grimmia caffra 
Grimmia calcarea 
Grimmia calycina 
Grimmia camonia 
Grimmia campylotricha 
Grimmia canariensis 
Grimmia capillata 
Grimmia chocayae 
Grimmia chrysoneura 
Grimmia chubutensis 
Grimmia churchilliana 
Grimmia cirrata 
Grimmia coarctata 
Grimmia compactula 
Grimmia controversa 
Grimmia crassifolia 
Grimmia crassinervia 
Grimmia cratericola 
Grimmia crinita 
Grimmia crinitoleucophaea 
Grimmia crispata 
Grimmia crispipila 
Grimmia crispula 
Grimmia cucullata 
Grimmia cucullatifolia 
Grimmia cupularis 
Grimmia curviseta 
Grimmia cyathocarpa 
Grimmia cylindropyxis 
Grimmia daviesii 
Grimmia decipiens 
Grimmia defoliata 
Grimmia depilis 
Grimmia dissimulata 
Grimmia donniana 
Grimmia elatior 
Grimmia elongata 
Grimmia erythraea 
Grimmia exquisita 
Grimmia falcata 
Grimmia fallax 
Grimmia fascicularis 
Grimmia filiformis 
Grimmia fontana 
Grimmia fontinaloides 
Grimmia forsteri 
Grimmia fulgens 
Grimmia funalis 
Grimmia fusca 
Grimmia fuscescens 
Grimmia fuscolutea 
Grimmia gebhardii 
Grimmia gigantea 
Grimmia gracilis 
Grimmia hamulosa 
Grimmia handelii 
Grimmia hartmanii 
Grimmia herzogii 
Grimmia heteromalla 
Grimmia homomalla 
Grimmia horrida 
Grimmia humilis 
Grimmia immergens 
Grimmia immersoleucophaea 
Grimmia inclinata 
Grimmia incrassicapsulis 
Grimmia incurva 
Grimmia indica 
Grimmia involucrata 
Grimmia jan-mayensis 
Grimmia japonica 
Grimmia julacea 
Grimmia kansuana 
Grimmia khasiana 
Grimmia kidderi 
Grimmia laevidens 
Grimmia laevigata 
Grimmia lamprocarpa 
Grimmia lanceolata 
Grimmia lanuginosa 
Grimmia lawiana 
Grimmia leibergii 
Grimmia lesherae 
Grimmia limbatula 
Grimmia linearis 
Grimmia lisae 
Grimmia longicaulis 
Grimmia longirostris 
Grimmia macroperichaetialis 
Grimmia macrotheca 
Grimmia macrotyla 
Grimmia madagassa 
Grimmia mairei 
Grimmia malacophylla 
Grimmia mammosa 
Grimmia mariniana 
Grimmia mauiensis 
Grimmia maunakeaensis 
Grimmia meridionalis 
Grimmia mexicana 
Grimmia microcarpa 
Grimmia microglobosa 
Grimmia microodonta 
Grimmia milleri 
Grimmia minuta 
Grimmia mixta 
Grimmia molesta 
Grimmia mollis 
Grimmia montana 
Grimmia moxleyi 
Grimmia muehlenbeckii 
Grimmia muelleri 
Grimmia mutica 
Grimmia navicularis 
Grimmia neilgiriensis 
Grimmia nepalensis 
Grimmia nevadensis 
Grimmia nigrescens 
Grimmia nigrita 
Grimmia nivalis 
Grimmia novae-zeelandiae 
Grimmia nuda 
Grimmia nutans 
Grimmia obtusata 
Grimmia obtusolinealis 
Grimmia ochracea 
Grimmia ochyriana 
Grimmia olivacea 
Grimmia olneyi 
Grimmia oranica 
Grimmia orbicularis 
Grimmia orthotrichacea 
Grimmia ovalis 
Grimmia pachyloma 
Grimmia pachyphylla 
Grimmia paramattensis 
Grimmia patagonica 
Grimmia percarinata 
Grimmia perichaetialis 
Grimmia pflanzii 
Grimmia pilifera 
Grimmia pilosissima 
Grimmia pitardii 
Grimmia plagiopodia 
Grimmia pomiformis 
Grimmia praemorsa 
Grimmia procumbens 
Grimmia protensum 
Grimmia pseudoanodon 
Grimmia pseudopatens 
Grimmia pulla 
Grimmia pulvinata 
Grimmia pulvinatula 
Grimmia pusilla 
Grimmia pycnotricha 
Grimmia pygmaea 
Grimmia ramondii 
Grimmia ramulosa 
Grimmia readeri 
Grimmia recurvirostris 
Grimmia reflexidens 
Grimmia retracta 
Grimmia richardii 
Grimmia rigidissima 
Grimmia robustifolia 
Grimmia rupestris 
Grimmia rupincola 
Grimmia saxatilis 
Grimmia saxicola 
Grimmia scabripes 
Grimmia schleicheri 
Grimmia sciuroides 
Grimmia scouleri 
Grimmia serrana 
Grimmia serratomucronata 
Grimmia sessitana 
Grimmia shastai 
Grimmia squamatula 
Grimmia starckeana 
Grimmia stenobasis 
Grimmia stenophylla 
Grimmia stirlingii 
Grimmia stolonifera 
Grimmia streptophylla 
Grimmia subcallosa 
Grimmia subconferta 
Grimmia subleucophaea 
Grimmia subpraemorsa 
Grimmia subsecunda 
Grimmia subtergestina 
Grimmia sulcipila 
Grimmia sundaica 
Grimmia syntrichiacea 
Grimmia tasmanica 
Grimmia teretinervis 
Grimmia tergestina 
Grimmia tergestina 
Grimmia texicana 
Grimmia torenii 
Grimmia torquata 
Grimmia torreyana 
Grimmia tortuosa 
Grimmia trichodes 
Grimmia trichophylla 
Grimmia triformis 
Grimmia trinervis 
Grimmia tristicha 
Grimmia tristichoides 
Grimmia truncatoapocarpa 
Grimmia tunariensis 
Grimmia ungeri 
Grimmia unicolor 
Grimmia urceolaris 
Grimmia urnulacea 
Grimmia vaginulata 
Grimmia verticillata 
Grimmia verticillatula 
Grimmia vulcanica 
Grimmia williamsii 
Grimmia wilsonii 
Grimmia wrightii 
Grimmia yaulensis

Latest discovered species 

In the past 15 years (1996 to 2010), the following Grimmia species have been discovered and described:

 Grimmia maido (Greven 1996)
 Grimmia macroperichaetialis (Greven 1998)
 Grimmia ochyriana (Muñoz 1998)
 Grimmia wilsonii (Greven 1998)
 Grimmia mexicana (Greven 1999)
 Grimmia molesta (Muñoz 1999)
 Grimmia indica (Goffinet & Greven 2000)
 Grimmia dissimulata (Maier 2002b)
 Grimmia nevadensis (Greven 2002)
 Grimmia serrana (Muñoz, Shevock & Toren 2002)
 Grimmia lesherae (Greven 2003)
 Grimmia mauiensis (Greven 2003)
 Grimmia maunakeaensis (Greven 2003)
 Grimmia shastae (Greven 2003)
 Grimmia milleri (Hastings & Greven 2007)
 Grimmia torenii (Hastings 2008)
 Grimmia texicana (Greven 2010)

References 

Maier, E. 2009). Grimmia in Europa. Ein Bestimmungsschlüssel. Herzogia 22: 229-302. 
Maier, E. (2010). The Genus Grimmia Hedw. (Grimmiaceae, Bryophyta): A Morphological-anatomical Study. Boissiera 63: 3-377

External links 
 Grimmias of the World Online reference guide, including more than 2000 macro- and microscopic photos of all 96 recognised Grimmia species. Additionally, the website includes a Worldchecklist, table of World distribution, European checklist and major ecological and morphological characters of the Grimmia species.

Moss genera
Grimmiales
Taxa named by Johann Hedwig